Bansalan, officially the Municipality of Bansalan, is a 1st class municipality in the province of Davao del Sur, Philippines. According to the 2020 census, it has a population of 62,737 people.

History

Bansalan was a forest primeval and the aborigines were Bagobos. As they were nomadic, they traveled from one place to the other by hacking their way through the virgin forests. They also cultivated land for their staple food but soon left the place after harvest time in search of a better place to cultivate. They also had the wide area of hunting ground where at the end of the day, they brought home speared wild boar, deer or monkeys. The implements they had were crude but obviously the bow and arrow were used both in hunting and fishing. The waters then were crystal pure and were untarnished by the changing current ecology. In some certain sites, Bansalan had patches of cogonal land interspersed with tall trees demarcated by serene creeks and turbulent rivers gushing from the belly of Mount Apo, the highest mountain peak in the Philippines where according to legend, Apo Sandawa ruled as god.

In early times, the Bagobo society was divided into datus or the chieftains, freemen, and slaves. The datus interpret customary laws. Marriages were arranged, the groom's parents selecting the bride and negotiating the match. A bride-price is paid according to their wealth, and the bride's parents also give a present equal to about half this amount to dispel the idea that they're selling their daughter. The groom has to serve the bride's family both before and after the wedding. The two-to three-day wedding ceremony takes place in the bride's home and ends with the bride and groom feeding each other a handful of rice. Young men strived to attain the rank of magani, a warrior class whose members had killed more than one enemy and were entitled to wear distinctive red clothing. A communal spirit prevailed, with everyone helping in house-building and cultivation.

The inhabitants in this early settlement venerated the anitos and their religion is a pantheon of innumerable gimokods (spirits), knowledge of which resides in old men and women known as mabalian.

The Bagobos celebrate Gin-Em festival which displays gratitude to the spirits for success in war or domestic matters, or for warding-off sickness, evil spirits, or danger. Two bamboo poles are erected in the house of a datu, then offerings are made, and a chicken is sacrificed. In former times, enemy skulls would be attached to the poles, and a slave sacrificed. Each magani relates his past exploits, and dancing, chanting of old songs and poems, feasting, and drinking fermented sugarcane wine continue till daybreak.

The Bagobos produce baskets trimmed with beads and fibers, ornate weapons, and inlaid metal boxes finished with bells. A metal box where they kept betel nuts is inseparable.

Bansalan was the name of the simple farmer who one day dug the earth in search of potable water to quench his thirst. Fortunately, he dug a well-spring, and did not only satisfy his thirst but also called his other companions to share his discovery. Rain widened the spring and the constant erosion of soil led its transformation into a creek, and later into a river. Unfortunately, Bansalan, the farmer did not live long. His companions who were the recipients of Bansalan's daring adventures named that the river after him and later also became the name of the fledgling village. President Elpidio Querino proclaimed Bansalan as a regular town on September 18, 1952, including two booming villages of Matanao and Kialeg in the south-west and western part of Bansalan which later became regular towns.

Davao del Sur and parts of Northern Cotabato were established by good-natured relationships of the chieftains. In the beginning of the 20th century, Datu Tumunas of Bansalan launched feeder road constructions with the help of his own tribe people. Tumunas succeeded in linking Bansalan with Digos, ushering in the establishment of a harmonious relation between the Bagobos and the Kalagans, the natives of Digos. The friendship has expanded by leaps and bounds when they encouraged constant "tabo" or market following the old system of "ukom" or barter. Datus of neighboring places came to Bansalan to establish friendly relations with Datu Tumunas. Among them were Datu Julian and Datu Akwas. Later Datu Siman of Kidapawan succeeded in constructing a road linking the place with Bansalan. More friendly relations were established as the road construction increased."

Bansalan is situated at the north-western part of the Province of Davao del Sur. Towards the south is the Municipality of Matanao, to the west is the Municipality of Magsaysay, to the southeast is the Municipality of Digos and on the north-east lies the Mt. Apo National Park. Its total land area is 48,548 hectares and divided into 23 villages or barrios where the Poblacion is the main center.

The Poblacion serves as the nerve-center of the town where all the schools, churches of different denominations, market, cinema, sports facilities, and other amenities are located. It is highly agricultural and most of the active young people work in Digos which now became the capital town of Davao del Sur. There are about 55,000 people living in the whole town including the villages.

In the early 1950s, a big number of migrants from other parts of the country but mainly from Cebu settled in Bansalan which drastically changed the lives of the Bagobos, the native inhabitants of the place. The Bagobos retreated to the hinterlands, and the settlers took over the running and further development of the town. At present, not one public official is a native Bagobo, the tribe which was responsible in the establishment of the town. What remained is the name of Datu Bansalan but his daring adventures are already long forgotten by the town people. Town anniversaries are celebrated with grand fiestas and parades but Datu Bansalan is no longer remembered in the history nor given an appropriate celebration in honor of his founding the town. People remember the date Pres. Quirino officially proclaimed Bansalan as a regular town as if the history of the town only started in September 1952.

In 1957, the barrios of Kibao, San Vicente, Kibuaya, Managa Km. 67, Sinawilan, New Visayas, Sacub, Upper Malabang, Temongbong, Sinaragan, Maliit Digos, Kapok, Tamlangon, Manga, Buas, New Katipunan, Da-Anama, Upper Kauswagan, Kagaulas, Kabasagan, Tuwak, Mal, Latian, Lanturi, Dongang-Pekong, La Union, Kauswagan and Paitan were separated from said municipality, and constituted into a new and independent municipality known as Matanao.

In the same year, the following sitios were converted into barrios: Buas, Mabunga, Manga, Tacul, Kanapolo, San Isidro, San Miguel, Bacongan, Dalawinon, New Clarin, Kasuga, Rizal, Dalumay, Darapuay, Kinuskusan, Tubod, Bitaug, Libertad, Buenavista, Mabini, Pananag, Union, Upper Managa, Mabuhay, Bonifacio, San Vicente, Kibao, Tinongtongan, Kabasagan, Tuwak, Maliit Digos, Tamlangon, New Katipunan, Upper Sacub, Sinarangan, Kibuaya, and Managa.

In 1959, barrio Kialeg was renamed Magsaysay.

Geography
The neighboring towns include Makilala in the north, Magsaysay in the west, Matanao in the south and Mount Apo and part of Digos in the east.

Climate

Barangays
Bansalan is politically subdivided into 25 barangays.

Demographics

Economy

Culture

Festivals
 Bansaulog Festival - every 18th day of September
 Immaculate Concepcion Fiesta - every 8th day of December
 Sinulog Sa Bansalan - every 28th day of January

Education

Private 
 St. Mary's College of Bansalan - Dahlia Street
 University of Mindanao Bansalan Campus - Ramon Delos Cientos Sr. Street, National Highway
 Nazareth High School - Nazareno Street
 St. Therese School of Bansalan - Nebrada Subdivision
 Gracious Redeemer Accelerated Christian Education - Lily Street, Poblacion
 Global System Institute of Technology - Ramon Delos Cientos Sr. Street, National Highway
 GRS School of Bansalan - Lily Street
 Mt. Carmel Development Academy - Kinuskusan
 Brighter Beginnings Learning Center of Bansalan, Inc. (Pre-kinder, Kinder & Elementary) - Rose St., Poblacion Dos

Public 

       Public High school
 Pedro A. Arches National High School

References

External links

 Bansalan Profile at the DTI Cities and Municipalities Competitive Index
 About Bansalan
 [ Philippine Standard Geographic Code]
 Philippine Census Information
 Local Governance Performance Management System
 WOWBANSALAN Website

Municipalities of Davao del Sur